The Academy of Fine Arts Nuremberg was founded in 1662 by Jacob von Sandrart and is the oldest art academy in German-speaking Central Europe.

The art academy is situated in Nuremberg.

Classes include studies in fine arts, sculpture, visual arts, painting, artistic concepts, art education, gold- and silversmithing, as well as graphic design. There are master courses in Architecture and Urban Studies, and Art and Public Space.

Teaching takes place today in an ensemble of transparent pavilions that were designed by German architect Sep Ruf and have been classified as an historical monument. Located at the edge of the city, the campus offers an intensive work atmosphere. In the exhibition hall of the Academy and in the Gallery of the Academy, young artists publicly present their work. In addition to the main location in Nuremberg's Zerzabelshof district, the college has been using space in the historical imperial castle in Lauf since 1985 as a branch location in which to accommodate the art education and art pedagogy classes.

Partnerships with art-universities in Western and Eastern Europe—Hungarian University of Fine Arts, Academy of Fine Arts, Helsinki, Jan Matejko Academy of Fine Arts-Cracow, Palermo, Riga, Sassari, Urbino, University of Applied Arts Vienna, Academy of Fine Arts Vienna—make it possible for students to complete part of their course of study abroad.

Notable students and professors
 Herbert Achternbusch
 Peter Angermann (1966–1968), professor 2002–2010
 Ernst von Bandel
 Willem van Bemmel
 Diego Bianconi
 Kathrin Böhm
 Gabriela Dauerer
 Otto Eckmann (1882–1885)
 Martin Eder (1993–1995)
 Rudolf Koch
 Georg Goldberg
 Johannes Götz
 Carl Haag
 Adolf von Hildebrand
 Karl Jäger
 Friedrich August von Kaulbach
 August von Kreling, director 1853–1874
 Richard Lindner
 Johann Daniel Preissler
 Michael Mathias Prechtl
 Johann Daniel Preissler,
 Karl Raupp, professor 1868–1879
 Paul Ritter
 August Johann Rösel von Rosenhof
 Sep Ruf
 Jacob von Sandrart
 Diet Sayler
 Juergen Teller
 Georg Philipp Wörlen
 Wolfgang Herrndorf

External links

 Akademie der Bildenden Künste Nürnberg

 
1662 establishments in the Holy Roman Empire
Educational institutions established in the 1660s
Education in Nuremberg
Tourist attractions in Nuremberg
Buildings and structures in Nuremberg
Architecture schools in Germany
Culture in Nuremberg
Nuremberg